The Usual Suspects is the ninth solo album of Joe Lynn Turner released in Japan in 2005.

Track listing
"Power of Love" (Cochran/Held/Turner) - 5:04
"Devil's Door" (Cochran/Held/Turner) - 3:29
"Jacknife" (Held/Lecar/Turner) - 3:23
"Really Loved" (Marksbury/Turner) - 4:30
"Rest of My Life" (Held/Lecar/Turner) - 4:38
"Into the Fire" (Marksbury/Turner) - 5:10
"Blood Money" (Cochran/Held/Turner) - 4:27
"All Alone" (Marksbury/Turner) - 5:01
"Ball and Chain" (Lecar/Turner) - 3:50
"Live and Love Again" (Lecar/Turner) - 5:23
"What Can I Do" (Turner/Byrd) - 3:48

European Pressing replaces "What Can I Do" with "Unfinished Bizness" (Markbury/Turner) - 3:40

Deluxe Pressing contains both "What Can I Do" and "Unfinished Bizness" as bonus tracks.

Personnel

Joe Lynn Turner: Lead vocals
Al Pitrelli: Guitars on 3,4,5,6,9,10,11
Karl Cochran: Guitars on 1,2,7,8
David Z: Bass
John O'Reilly: Drums
Paul Morris: Keyboards
Andy Burton: Keyboards on 11
Nancy Bender: Backing vocals

Production

Mark Wexler: Executive Producer 
Gary Tole: Engineer

References

Joe Lynn Turner albums
2005 albums